TKSS is an initialism which may refer to:

 The Kapil Sharma Show, a Hindi stand up comedy and talk show
 Tanjong Katong Secondary School, a school in Katong, Singapore